Abraham of Scetes was a monk who became a saint of the Coptic Church.

He was born the son of a wealthy landowner in Egypt, and became a monk under Jonas. He is alleged to have had a vision of Christ riding the chariot of the Cherubim. He died after eighteen years of suffering from an illness at Djirdjeh. His cell, called Dshabih, later became a famous shrine. His feast day in the Coptic Church is January 4.

See also 

 Desert Fathers
 Or (monk)

References

Christian saints in unknown century
Year of birth missing
Year of death unknown
Coptic Orthodox saints
Egyptian Christian monks
Desert Fathers